The 2005 Copa Sudamericana Finals was a two-legged football match-up to determine the 2005 Copa Sudamericana champion. It was contested by Mexican club UNAM and Argentinian club Boca Juniors. Boca was defending their trophy and Pumas UNAM were playing in their first Copa Sudamericana finals.

The first leg was played in Estadio Olímpico Universitario in Mexico D.F. on 6 December 6, and the match was tied 1–1. The second leg was played in La Bombonera ("Estadio Alberto J. Armando"), in Buenos Aires on December 18, and, again, the match was tied 1–1, so in the penalty shoot-out Boca won 4–3 and was thus crowned the champions, successfully defending their title. As the winner, Boca earned the right to play in the 2006 Recopa Sudamericana against the winner of the 2005 Copa Libertadores.

Qualified teams

Road to the Finals

Matches

First leg

Second Leg

References

2005
s
s
2005–06 in Argentine football
2005–06 in Mexican football
2005
s